"Candy Ball" is the first Korean digital single (sixth overall) by Hong Kong girl group As One. The digital single was released on July 13, 2015 by Chrok Baem Juna.

History

The song was produced by well-known producer Iggy and Seo Youngbae.

Promotion
The song made its debut performance by the group on SBS MTV's The Show on July 14, 2015.

Track listing

Chart performance

Single charts
'Candy Ball'

Music charts

References

2015 songs
2015 singles